The 1923 Racine Legion season was their second in the league. The team failed to improve on their previous output of 6–4–1, winning only four games. They finished tenth in the league.

Schedule

Standings

References

Racine Legion seasons
Racine Legion
Racine Legion